Slobodan Škerović (born 27 September 1954 in Belgrade) is a Serbian author, painter and philosopher, and a member of the international neo-avantgarde Signalism movement.

Biography 
Škerović studied painting at the Faculty of Applied Arts in Belgrade and Kunstakademie in Düsseldorf. He has had poems and articles published since 1976 in numerous Yugoslav journals: Haiku, Student, Vidici, Knjizevna reč, Koraci, Stvaranje, Signal, Rukovet, Savremenik, Književne novine... He was editor of the Student and Vidici journals from 1980 to 1982, and for a short time was a comics writer and a member of Belgrade's comics art group "Tuš grupa".
 
As an author and editor he has actively participated in the Signalist neo-avantgarde movement since 2001, and the "Project Rastko" Cultural Network since 2007.  He has been a member of the Association of Fine Artists of Serbia since 1996, the Writers Association of Serbia since 2008, and the Association of Serbian Comics Artists since 2010.

Škerović's literary works are characterized by longer poetic forms, with intensive synthesis of traditional spirituality and advanced technology, in poems, essays and science fictionnovels.

Solo exhibitions 
 1988. – Belgrade, "Braća Stamenković" Gallery – paintings
 1992. – Belgrade, "Sunce" Gallery – paintings
 1994. – Belgrade, "Paleta" Gallery (Cultural center of Belgrade) – paintings
 1996. – Beograd, "House of Đura Jakšić", Skadarlija – paintings
 1996. – Belgrade, "Braća Stamenković" Gallery – miniatures

Books 
 "Gift" /Poklon/ (Poem) on a single record, Vidici, no. 3, 1980, side B (side A: VIS Idoli songs "Pomoć, pomoć, pomoć" and "Retko te viđam sa devojkama").
 Glossary of Technology /Rečnik tehnologije/, Vidici, special issue, one of the authors, no. 1-2, 1981.
 Hearts /Srca/ (collection of poems ), Supernova, Belgrade, 1987.
 Indigo (collection of poems), Signal Library, Belgrade, 2005, 
 All the colors of Arcturus /Sve boje Arkturusa/ (experimental prose), library "Svetske sveske", Beogradska manufaktura snova, Belgrade, 2006. 
 Chimera or Borg /Himera ili Borg/ (essays), library "Gold Edition", Tardis, Belgrade, 2008. .
 Black Box /Crna kutija/ (collection of poems), Tardis, Belgrade, 2010. .
 Hugging children /Zagrljena deca/ (collection of poems), Tardis, Belgrade, 2010. .
 Comics we loved: Selection of comics and creators from the former Yugoslavia in the twentieth century (the critical lexicon), the authors and editors Živojin Tamburić, Zdravko Zupan and Zoran Stefanovic, Omnibus, Belgrade, 2011. Lexicon contains Škerović reviews on Yugoslav comics. .
 Shamaniad /Šamanijada/ (novel), edition "Znak Sagite" Book 59, Everest Media, Belgrade, 2012. .
 The dark side of the Force /Tamna strana sile/ (novel), edition "Znak Sagite" Book 69, Everest Media, Belgrade, 2013. .
 Jericho, Jericho, and the poems Chrome and Death of plumule /Jerihon, Jerihon i poeme Kroma i Smrt paperja/ (collection of poems), library "Signal", Everest Media, Belgrade, 2013. .
 Earthphobia /Zemljofobija/ (poetic novel), library "Signal", Everest Media, Belgrade, 2013. .
 Invisible Mars /Nevidljivi Mars/ (poetic novel), library "Signal", Everest Media, Belgrade, 2013. .
 The Vulcan philosophy /Vulkanska filozofija/ (essays), library "Signal", Everest Media, Belgrade, 2013. .
 Thrushes in Hell /Drozdovi u Paklu/ (collection of poems), library "Signal", Everest Media, Belgrade, 2013. .

Awards 
 Award of The Association of SF fans "Lazar Komarčić" for the best Serbian story published in 2006. ("Blair Alpha")

Notes

External links 
 The dark side of the Force, author's e-library at Project Rastko, ed. by Zoran Stefanović
 "Poems and Essays", personal website, English and Serbian
 Signalism at Project Rastko, e-library

1954 births
Living people
Writers from Belgrade
Serbian novelists
Serbian painters
Serbian male poets
Serbian translators
20th-century Serbian philosophers
Serbian literary theorists
Serbian literary critics
Serbian male short story writers
Serbian non-fiction writers
Serbian science fiction writers
Serbian comics writers
Comics critics
Postmodern writers
Signalism
Artists from Belgrade
Male non-fiction writers